Lamachan Hill is a hill in the Minnigaff Hills, a sub-range of the Galloway Hills range, part of the Southern Uplands of Scotland.

References

Marilyns of Scotland
Donald mountains
Mountains and hills of the Southern Uplands
Mountains and hills of Dumfries and Galloway
Grahams